USS Tide may refer to two ships of the United States Navy:

 , a tugboat built in 1916 at Manitowoc, Wisconsin, by the Manitowoc Shipbuilding Co
 , laid down on 16 March 1942 at Savannah, Georgia, by the Savannah Machinery and Foundry Company.

United States Navy ship names